Palamut (Greek: Δρυϊνοχώρι Dryïnochṓri ) is a village in the district of Şarköy, Tekirdağ Province, Turkey.  It is thirty kilometres from the town of Şarköy.

The primarily occupation is as a farmer. The village has a drinking water supply system, but no sewer system. There is a branch post office. Electricity and telephone service are available.

The population of the village has been declining. In 1985 it was 113, in 1997 it was 73, in 2000 it was 63 and as of 2011, the population was 44.

Notes

Villages in Şarköy District